Aldabrachelys abrupta, the abrupt giant tortoise, is an extinct species of giant tortoise that was endemic to Madagascar.

Ecology
It was a large species, roughly 115 cm in length. It was originally one of the six endemic tortoise species of Madagascar (two large Aldabrachelys; three medium Astrochelys; two small Pyxis). It was sympatric with the other giant tortoise species of Madagascar, Grandidier's giant tortoise (Aldabrachelys grandidieri (also extinct)), and both species occupied both the coasts and the cooler highlands of Madagascar, where they fulfilled the role of large grazers. A. abrupta was a browser of bushes and low-hanging branches; A. grandidieri was a grazer of grassy meadows and wetlands.

Unlike its sister species, which had a low, flattened shell, A. abrupta had a high, domed shell.

Extinction
Material of this species has been dated to 750–2850 years before present, and it seems to have been widely distributed throughout Madagascar. It was estimated to have gone extinct c. AD 1200. However, remains with disputed dating have suggested that some survived up until at least 1500, and it seems to have survived a considerable time in coexistence with humans, before it finally died out.

References

External links

Aldabrachelys
Extinct animals of Madagascar
Holocene extinctions
Fossil taxa described in 1868
Extinct turtles